A partial List of Democratic Republic of the Congo films follows:

See also
Cinema of the Democratic Republic of the Congo

References